Basalia serius is a moth of the family Erebidae first described by Michael Fibiger in 2008. It is known from Tamil Nadu in south-central India.

The wingspan is about 15 mm. The forewing is long, pointed and brown. The crosslines are black and the terminal line is marked with black interveinal dots. The hindwing is dark greyish and the underside of the forewing is light brown, while the underside of the hindwing is grey, with an indistinct postmedial line and a discal spot.

References

Micronoctuini
Moths described in 2008